Geurt Schoonman (17 December 1896 – 19 February 1971) was a Dutch sports shooter. He competed in the 50 m rifle event at the 1948 Summer Olympics.

References

1896 births
1971 deaths
Dutch male sport shooters
Olympic shooters of the Netherlands
Shooters at the 1948 Summer Olympics
People from Brummen
Sportspeople from Gelderland